Baksheyka is a rural locality (a village) in Pertsevskoye Rural Settlement, Gryazovetsky District, Vologda Oblast, Russia. The population was 18 as of 2002.

Geography 
Baksheyka is located 21 km north of Gryazovets (the district's administrative centre) by road. Medvedevo is the nearest rural locality.

References 

Rural localities in Gryazovetsky District